United Nations Security Council resolution 1168, adopted unanimously on 21 May 1998, after recalling resolutions 1031 (1995), 1035 (1995), 1088 (1996), 1103 (1997), 1107 (1997) and 1144 (1997), the Council strengthened the International Police Task Force (IPTF) in Bosnia and Herzegovina by up to 30 posts to a total strength of 2,057.

There was a need for more training for local police in Bosnia and Herzegovina, particularly in terms of incident management, corruption, organised crime and drug control. The Council acknowledged that reform of the judicial reform and police reform were closely linked.

The resolution authorised an additional increase in the number of IPTF posts by up to 30 personnel, with a total strength of 2,057, as part of the United Nations Mission in Bosnia and Herzegovina (UNMIBH). It supported improvements to the structure of IPTF and encouraged Member States to contribute equipment, training and other assistance for local police forces in Bosnia and Herzegovina. The resolution concluded by recognising that the establishment of an indigenous public security capability was essential for strengthening the rule of law in the country and legal reform.

See also
 Bosnian War
 Dayton Agreement
 List of United Nations Security Council Resolutions 1101 to 1200 (1997–1998)
 Yugoslav Wars

References

External links
 
Text of the Resolution at undocs.org

 1168
 1168
1998 in Yugoslavia
1998 in Bosnia and Herzegovina
 1168
May 1998 events